R Adams Cowley Shock Trauma Center (also referred to simply as Shock Trauma) is a free-standing trauma hospital in Baltimore, Maryland and is part of the University of Maryland Medical Center. It is the first facility in the world to treat shock.  Shock Trauma was founded by R Adams Cowley, considered the father and major innovator of trauma medicine.

Early years

While serving in the United States Army in France immediately following World War II, Cowley observed that many severe traumatic injuries could be stabilized if the patient could be transported to a military hospital where a surgeon was present within one hour of the initial injury. Cowley coined the term "golden hour" to describe this crucial period of time. Cowley thus lobbied the legislature in Maryland to purchase helicopters for the transport of trauma patients to expedite their arrival to these higher-care facilities.  The Maryland legislature initially denied his request, due to the cost of helicopters, but he was subsequently able to persuade the State of Maryland to purchase helicopters by agreeing to the premise they be shared with the Maryland State Police. Today, almost all major trauma centers in the United States utilize helicopters to transport trauma patients to the hospital.

During the establishment of trauma centers in the early 1970s, Cowley fought with the medical community to change the prevailing policy of first responders taking all patients, including traumas, to the "nearest hospital first." According to Cowley, the major flaw to this system was that the nearest hospital was most likely not capable of treating severe trauma. In 1975, Dutch Ruppersberger, a young prosecutor (and current member of Congress) was involved in a nearly fatal automobile accident and had his life saved largely in part to being transported directly to University of Maryland's Shock Trauma Center. When Ruppersberger asked Cowley what he could do to repay him for saving his life, Cowley responded, "Run for office so you can help us get the resources we need to continue saving lives.” Ruppersberger successfully ran for numerous local, state, and federal elective offices all the while advocating for shock trauma. The policy of "nearest hospital first" was eventually abandoned, and emergency medical systems across the United States now follow the model first advocated by Cowley.

Facilities
Shock Trauma houses over 100 inpatient beds dedicated to emergency surgery, resuscitation, intensive care, and acute surgical care. The facility boasts a dedicated resuscitation area in excess of 13 beds. The Trauma Resuscitation Unit (TRU) is located on the building's second floor. Helicopters and ambulances bring injured patients directly to the TRU for emergency treatment and stabilization. Specialized trauma teams composed of trauma surgeons and emergency medicine physicians triage and treat patients as they arrive by helicopter and ambulance. Teams of consultants are available 24/7 and include orthopedic surgeons, neurosurgeons, vascular surgeons, plastic and reconstructive surgeons, radiologists, anesthesiologists, and others. Shock Trauma is an academic institution and emergency-medicine residents, trauma fellows, and surgical residents are involved in all aspects of patient care and evaluation. A large team of trauma physician assistants, nurse practitioners, nurses, and technicians complete the trauma team personnel and stand ready to receive victims 24 hours a day, 365 days per year. The helipad at Shock Trauma can accommodate up to four medevac helicopters at one time and has direct elevator access to the resuscitation area several stories below.

Adjacent to the TRU is a vast array of equipment and facilities that are immediately available to the patient in extremis. Shock Trauma has nine dedicated operating suites, its own unique trauma post-anesthesia care unit, in addition to two dedicated multislice CT scanners, an angiography suite, and digital plain film capability. The inpatient wards of the Shock Trauma center consist of specialized intensive-care units, intermediate-care units, and regular surgical-floor beds. Shock Trauma can admit patients directly into the operating room if their condition requires it. Intensive care at Shock Trauma is a multidisciplinary endeavor: the facility boasts dedicated units for victims of multi-system and neurosurgical trauma.

In 2013, Shock Trauma Center completed and opened a major expansion to the facility. Renovating around 68 patient rooms to conform with modern-day standards.

Education
Shock Trauma trains physicians and medical personnel from locations overseas and throughout the United States. In addition to training residents at the University of Maryland itself, the facility hosts emergency-medicine and surgery residents from all over the United States and Canada. Shock Trauma receives over 7500 admissions per year and provides its residents with intensive training in the evaluation and management of both blunt and penetrating injury.

In May 2007, Thomas M. Scalea, physician-in-chief for the R Adams Cowley Shock Trauma Center, presented a case at the University of Maryland Medical School's annual historical clinicopathological conference in Baltimore on the assassination of President Abraham Lincoln and whether the world's first center for trauma victims could have improved the outcome had Lincoln's assassination occurred today. "This could be a recoverable injury, with a reasonable expectation he would survive," Scalea said, noting that the assassin's weapon was relatively impotent compared to the firepower now on the streets today.

Shock Trauma's educational mission extends beyond the training of future physicians. The facility hosts members of the United States Armed Forces, in addition to providing education for local emergency-medical service providers.

Movie
In 1982, a television movie was produced by Telecom Entertainment and Glen Warren Productions about Cowley, his discovery of "The Golden Hour" and his crusade to establish the first fully dedicated trauma center in the world. The movie starred William Conrad (of Cannon fame) as Cowley. It was syndicated on TV stations all across the United States on October 27, 1982.

Television

The television docudrama series Shock Trauma: Edge of Life, which aired on Discovery Life was filmed at R Adams Cowley Shock Trauma Center.

References

External links
 

Hospital buildings completed in 1960
Hospitals in Baltimore
University of Maryland, Baltimore